Dances with Wolves is a 1988 American Civil War novel by Michael Blake. Originally written as an unsold spec script, it was converted into a novel at the behest of Kevin Costner; it was finally adapted into a film of the same name, directed by Costner, in 1990. Union Lieutenant John Dunbar finds himself stranded in the wilderness and comes to live with a tribe of Comanche people, soon taking the name Dances with Wolves. The novel and film later came under criticism for similarity to Elliot Silverstein's A Man Called Horse.

On September 4, 2001, Michael Blake published The Holy Road, a sequel to Dances with Wolves; the story is set eleven years later, and deals with the increasing conflict between the Plains Indians and the white man, with tragic outcomes.

References

1988 American novels
American novels adapted into films
Novels set during the American Civil War